Yu Dequan (22 October 1932 – 31 December 2022) was a Chinese pharmaceutical chemist, and an academician of the Chinese Academy of Engineering.

Biography
Yu was born into a family of farming background in Penglai County (now Penglai District), Shandong, on 22 October 1932. 

In 1947, he became a worker at the Xinhua Pharmaceutical Factory under the Department of Health of Jiaodong Military Region. In 1952, he was accepted to Beijing Medical College (now Peking University Health Science Center), where he majored in pharmaceutical chemistry. After graduating in 1956, he was despatched to the Institute of Materia Medica, Chinese Academy of Medical Sciences. Between 1980 and 1981, he studied at the Institute of Natural Material Chemistry, French Academy of Sciences.

On 31 December 2022, he died in Beijing, at the age of 90.

Honours and awards
 1999 Member of the Chinese Academy of Engineering (CAE)
 2019 Member of the Chinese Academy of Medical Sciences (CAMS)

References

1932 births
2022 deaths
People from Yantai
Engineers from Shandong
Chinese chemists
Peking University alumni
Members of the Chinese Academy of Engineering